The Dove Elbe is a closed anabranch of the Unterelbe, the lower part of the river Elbe (near Hamburg, Germany).

The inflow is blocked by a dike since 1438. The lower end was shortened by a redirection of the Norderelbe in 1579.

Its Low German name translates to "deaf Elbe"; it is etymologically unrelated to the bird.

See also
List of rivers of Hamburg

Rivers of Hamburg
Bergedorf
Rivers of Germany